Route 296 is 60 km two-lane north/south highway in Quebec, Canada, which starts west of Sainte-Françoise at the junction of Route 293 and ends in Saint-Michel-du-Squatec at the junction of Route 295. Provincial highways with even numbers usually follow the Saint Lawrence River in a somewhat east/west direction, but Route 296 is a north/south highway in most of its length.

Towns along Route 296

 Saint-Michel-du-Squatec
 Biencourt
 Lac-des-Aigles
 Saint-Guy
 Saint-Médard
 Sainte-Françoise

See also
 List of Quebec provincial highways

References

External links 
 Provincial Route Map (Courtesy of the Quebec Ministry of Transportation) 
 Route 296 on Google Maps

296